The Thailand Women's National Wheelchair Basketball Team is the wheelchair basketball side that represents Thailand in international competitions for women as part of the International Wheelchair Basketball Federation.

Current roster
The team's current roster for the 2014 Wheelchair Basketball World Championship is:

Head coach:

Competitions
The Thai women's team has not competed at the Wheelchair Basketball World Championship or at the Summer Paralympics.

Wheelchair Basketball World Championship

Asia Oceania Zone

References

External links
 

W
Wheelchair basketball
National women's